Lunds BK is a football club from Lund, Sweden founded in 1919. The club currently plays in Division 1 Södra.

Despite their relative success Lunds BK has never competed in the Allsvenskan or Superettan, but has played nine seasons in the second highest level.  The club is well known for their youth football programme and has managed numerous players such as Martin Dahlin and Roger Ljung who have progressed to major clubs.

History
The team was first formed in 1919 when Lund GIF's youth players rebelled against their coach because they were not getting any playing time. The entire youth squad along with some players from IFK Lund were without club affiliation.

Two youth players, Gustav 'Gast' Persson and Bertil Larsson requested Berndt Paulsson to form the new club. Gunnar Björnhammar became the chairman and the rest of the board consisted of youth players.

In the year that they were formed the team only played one match which they won 4–1 with an attendance of 165 people. Almkvist scored 2 goals and thus became that year's leading scorer.

From 1919 to 1923, the club did not play league football. During this time, the club played 95 matches.

In 1923 Nils Nilsson (Pegen) was the top scorer with 20 goals in 26 matches. In 1924, LBK played 34 matches of which they won 15 games and lost 11.

The next year the club competed in a new league called Sydsvenskan. Since then the club has continued to progress despite the fact that their league position has fluctuated over the years.  Over the last 20 years the club has mainly competed in Division 2 Södra Götaland but they have had 3 seasons in Division 1 Södra.

The club is affiliated to the Skånes Fotbollförbund.

Some significant dates in LBK's history: 1920 – 2010

 1920: First football exchanges with Malmö FF.
 1921: First international match was played in Copenhagen.
 1923: First victory over Lund GIF.  Club Eels introduced.
 1924: The club gets its first female member.
 1929: A-awaited training plan built on the sports site.
 1930: Club rooms expanded and equipped for the cold.
 1941: Youth Football programme is introduced
 1942: Indoor Football makes premiere in Lund.
 1947: The team goes up in Division 3. Nils-Åke Sandell as top scorer with 76 goals. Attendance record is increased to 3,234 persons against IFK Värnamo, in Division 3 October 5. It is said that this year was the best football year through all time for LBK.
 1950: The club hires a full-time coach.
 1958: An ice hockey division is formed.
 1960: Ice hockey division is shut down due to lack of interest
 1972:  Women's soccer makes an entrance in the club.
 1974: The women's league wins the women's division 3.
 1984: Record attendance increases to 5,201 spectators at Klostergårdens IP, when LBK face IFK Malmö.
 1985: New attendance record of 5,586, on Thursday, 29 August. Match of the Swedish Cup against Malmö FF (1–6)
 2005: LBK win against Västra Frölunda IF in the Swedish Cup.
 2006: LBK P91 finished in 10th place (20 teams) in the Nike Premier Cup (European Championships for club teams)
 2007: Emil Alriksson prepares Lunds BK's 7000: the objectives. Johan Blomberg wins award as Division 2's best midfielder.

Season to season

* League restructuring in 2006 resulted in a new division being created at Tier 3 and subsequent divisions dropping a level.
|}

Current squad

Staff

Sports
Head coach:
 Jimmi Olsson

Assistant coaches:
 Thierry Zahui
 Igor Arsenijevic

Goalkeeper coach:
 Milos Sokolovic

Head coach youth academy:
 Stefan Jansson

Management
Team leader:
 Ingemar Sjölin

Director of Sport:
 Bo Cronqvist

Medical
Masseur:
 Jan Rasmusson

Physiotherapists:
 Axel Granbom

Achievements

League
 Division 1 Södra:
 Runners-up (1): 2012

References

External links
 Lunds BK
 Supporters
 Swedish Fans: Lunds BK

 
Football clubs in Skåne County
Sport in Skåne County
Association football clubs established in 1919
1919 establishments in Sweden